Prozonarina is an extinct genus of sea snail, a cowry, a marine gastropod mollusk in the subfamily Zonariinae of the family Cypraeidae, the cowries.

Fossil record
Fossils of Prozonarina are found in marine strata from the Oligocene to the Miocene (age range: from 23.03 to 5.332 million years ago.).  Fossils are known from Italy, France, Italy, Malta, Poland, Romania, Turkey  and Greece.

Species
 †Prozonarina barcamorpha Dolin and Lozouet, 2004
 †Prozonarina brocchii Deshayes, 1844
 †Prozonarina expansa Grateloup, 1847
 †Prozonarina fabagina Lamarck, 1810
 †Prozonarina haueriana Dolin and Lozouet, 2004
 †Prozonarina maxima Grateloup, 1847
 † Prozonarina mineurensis Dolin & Lozouet, 2004 
 † Prozonarina nigricans Dolin & Lozouet, 2004 
 †Prozonarina regalis Dolin and Lozouet, 2004

References

External links
 Schilder F.A. (1941). Verwandtschaft und Verbreitung der Cypraeacea. Archiv für Molluskenkunde. 73(2-3): 57-120

Cypraeidae